Anirut Suebyim, is a professional footballer from Thailand.

External links
 

1990 births
Living people
Anirut Suebyim
Anirut Suebyim
Association football forwards
Anirut Suebyim
Anirut Suebyim
Anirut Suebyim
Anirut Suebyim